Inwardo or Gülgöze ( - Iwardo or In wardo, Ayin Warda, Ain Wardo) is a village in the Midyat District of the Mardin Province of Turkey.

Gülgöze is populated by Assyrians and had a population of 272 in 2021.

History

First World War
Prior to the start of the First World War, the village had about 200 families, all of whom belonged to the Syriac Orthodox Church. During the Assyrian genocide, tens of thousands of refugees from throughout Tur Abdin arrived here for safety. At one point, the number of people in the village was up to 21,980 people. Refugees arrived from villages including Habasnos, Midyat, Bote, Keferze, Kafro Eloyto, Mzizah and Urnas. Even refugees from outside Tur Abdin arrived, coming from villages such as Deqlath, Bscheriye, Gozarto, Hesno d Kifo and Mifarqin.

Being aware of the Turks and Kurds were coming to Gülgöze, the villagers and refugees created a militia to defend themselves, which was led by Gallo Shabo. Their resistance lasted 60 days, and ended in success. 

At the same time, the Kurdish authority of Midyat was given orders to attack Gülgöze and Arnas. However, Aziz Agha, the leader of the Midyat area, told them that they didn't have enough soldiers to attack both areas, and therefore they would attack Gulgoze only, and then go to Arnas later on. Therefore, The Kurds of Tur Abdin and Ramman, under the generalship of Ahmed Agha and Salem Agha, collected themselves in Mardin, and created a unit of 13,000 men. The government authorized the distribution of arms, and they headed towards Gülgöze, arriving late at night to begin the siege.

After hours of gun-battle, the villagers defeated the Kurds and drove them out, but there were many casualties on both sides regardless. After 10 days, The Kurds attacked again only to be beaten yet again, as they lost well over 300 men. Before the beginning of a third attempt, Kurdish leaders called for aid from the mayors of Diyarbakır (Raschid) and Mardin (Badri). However, after a third attempt also failed and after 30 days of battle, Aziz Agha suggested a peace treaty between the two sides. 3 villagers met with Aziz to discuss a peace treaty, But the villagers refused to lay down their weapons, thus the battle continued. The siege continued for another 30 days leading to many deaths on both sides. In the end, the Kurdish soldiers surrendered and left the Syriac Orthodox population of Tur Abdin alone, hence why the Tur Abdin region is the only Christian populated area left in Turkey outside of Istanbul. The total death toll of this 60-day siege is unknown, but there were at least 1,000 deaths with both sides losses combined.

References 

Tur Abdin
Assyrian communities in Turkey
Villages in Midyat District
Places of the Assyrian genocide